Sayidaty (Arabic سيدتي Sayyidatī, meaning My Lady in English) is a weekly Arabic and a monthly English women's magazine published in both Riyadh and Beirut and distributed throughout the Middle East, North Africa, Europe and America.

History
Sayidaty was founded by Hisham Hafiz and his brother Muhammed Hafiz in London. Later, it was started in Riyadh in March 1981. The magazine was relocated from London to Riyadh in 2005. The English edition was launched in 2007.

Hala Al Nasser, who is current editor-in-chief of Rotana Magazine, is one of the magazine's former editors. As of 2013 Mohammed Fahad Al-Harthi was the editor-in-chief of the magazine who appointed to the post in 2004. As of 2010 Lebanese journalist Hadia Said was the cultural editor of the magazine. 

End of 2020 Lama Alshethri was the editor-in-chief of the magazine.

Ownership
Sayidaty is one of the magazines published by Saudi Research and Publishing Company, a subsidiary of Saudi Research and Marketing Group (SRMG). SRMG also owns other magazines such as Al Jamila, The Majalla, Bassim, Urdu Magazine and Hia as well as newspapers such as Arab News, Al Eqtisadiah, Urdu News and Asharq al Awsat.

Contents
Sayidaty, the first and only Pan Arab women weekly, provides professional and quality reading, making it the most powerful advertising vehicle among women's magazine in Saudi Arabia and the Persian Gulf region. The magazine mostly covers a wide range of topics favoured by the modern Arab women, from beauty and fashion to social and family life.

In June 2013 it was expanded to cover two new sections: one on human behavior, and another for teenagers and college students.

Target readership and circulation
The magazine is said to target primarily families, focusing on conscious housewives. Sayidaty, along with Al Yamamah and The Majalla, is among popular magazines in Saudi Arabia.

The circulation of the magazine at the end of the 1990s was 140,000 copies per issue. In April 2014, its online version received 39 million hits according to the reports by the editor-in-chief.

See also
List of magazines in Saudi Arabia

References

External links
 

1981 establishments in Saudi Arabia
Arabic-language magazines
English-language magazines
Magazines established in 1981
Magazines published in Beirut
Magazines published in London
Magazines published in Saudi Arabia
Mass media in Riyadh
Monthly magazines
Women's magazines
Weekly magazines